Balmoral High School may refer to:

 Balmoral Hall School, Winnipeg, Manitoba, Canada
 Balmoral High School, Belfast, Northern Ireland, UK
 Balmoral Junior Secondary School, North Vancouver, British Columbia, Canada
 Balmoral State High School, Queensland, Australia